The Alamyshik Formation is a geological formation in Kyrgyzstan whose strata date back to the Albian stage of the Early Cretaceous. Pterosaur remains are among the fossils that have been recovered from the formation.

Fossil content 

Reptiles
 Ferganemys verzilini
 Kirgizemys exaratus
 Petrochelys kyrgyzensis
 Crocodylia indet.
 Pterosauria indet.
 ?Labyrinthodontia indet.

Fish
 cf. Furo sp.
 Actinopterygii indet.

See also 
 List of pterosaur-bearing stratigraphic units

References

Bibliography 
 Barrett, P.M., Butler, R.J., Edwards, N.P., & Milner, A.R. Pterosaur distribution in time and space: an atlas. p61-107. in Flugsaurier: Pterosaur papers in honour of Peter Wellnhofer. 2008. Hone, D.W.E., and Buffetaut, E. (eds). Zitteliana B, 28. 264pp.

Further reading 
 D. M. Unwin and N. N. Bakhurina. 2000. Pterosaurs from Russia, Middle Asia and Mongolia. In M. J. Benton, M. A. Shishkin, D. M. Unwin, E. N. Kurochkin (eds.), The Age of Dinosaurs in Russia and Mongolia. Cambridge University Press, Cambridge 420-433
 L. A. Nessov. 1995. Dinozavri severnoi Yevrazii: Novye dannye o sostave kompleksov, ekologii i paleobiogeografii [Dinosaurs of northern Eurasia: new data about assemblages, ecology, and paleobiogeography]. Institute for Scientific Research on the Earth's Crust, St. Petersburg State University, St. Petersburg 1-156
 L. A. Nessov. 1984. Data on late Mesozoic turtles from the USSR. Studia Geologica Salamanticensia, vol. especial 1 (Studia Palaeocheloniologica I) 1:215-223

Geologic formations of Kyrgyzstan
Lower Cretaceous Series of Asia
Albian Stage
Shale formations
Fluvial deposits
Lacustrine deposits
Paleontology in Kyrgyzstan